Richemont is a commune in the Seine-Maritime department in the Normandy region in northern France.

It was the namesake for Richmond, North Yorkshire in England, which was itself the namesake for many other places around the world such as Richmond, Virginia in the United States.

Geography

Population

Places of interest
 The church of St. Michel, dating from the thirteenth century.

See also
Communes of the Seine-Maritime department

References

Communes of Seine-Maritime